Area code 308 is the telephone area code in the North American Numbering Plan for western Nebraska. It was created on July 1, 1954, by splitting the numbering plan area (NPA) 402 along a roughly S-shaped boundary line from the western half of the Nebraska–South Dakota border to the approximate center of the Nebraska–Kansas border. A roughly 50-mile segment of the line running northeast to southwest in the eastern third of the state follows the Platte River.

With Nebraska's population concentrated on the state's eastern edge in the cities of Omaha and Lincoln, numbering plan area 308 is one of the most sparsely populated in the nation. According to projections, 308 will remain in its current configuration until at least 2050, as its supply of telephone numbers is in no immediate danger of exhaustion.

Major towns

Alliance
Chadron
Gering
Grand Island
Kearney
McCook
North Platte
Ogallala
Scottsbluff
Sidney

See also
List of NANP area codes

References

External links

List of exchanges from AreaCodeDownload.com, 308 Area Code
308 Area Code Information

Telecommunications-related introductions in 1954
308
308